Jondan (also Romanized as Jondān; also known as Jow Dān and Jūdān) is a village in Rudasht-e Sharqi Rural District, Bon Rud District, Isfahan County, Isfahan Province, Iran. At the 2006 census, its population was 1,790, in 516 families.

References 

Populated places in Isfahan County